The 2005 Australian Football International Cup was the second time that the Australian Football International Cup tournament, an international Australian rules football competition was held.

The event was hosted by both Melbourne and Wangaratta, Australia in 2005.

10 nations participated following the late withdrawal of both Nauru and Denmark and the introduction of Spain. 

All sides were scheduled to play 4 games, after which the top 4 sides played off in semi-finals for a berth in the Grand Final decider. The Grand Final was between Papua New Guinea and New Zealand. Both sides went through the tournament undefeated. It was played as a curtain raiser to an official Australian Football League premiership season match and was replayed on Fox Sports (Australia) and the Fox Footy Channel.

New Zealand were crowned international champions for the first time.

Tournament results

Round 1 

(Wednesday 3 August 2005)

Round 2 
(Friday 5 August 2005)

Round 3 
(Sunday 7 August 2005)

Round 4 
(Tuesday 9 August 2005)

Ladder after four rounds

Semifinals 
(Thursday 11 August 2005)

Qualifying finals round 
(Thursday 11 August 2005)

Minor placing finals 
(Saturday 13 August 2005)

Grand final 
(Saturday 13 August 2005)

The Grand Final was replayed on Fox Sports (Australia) and the Fox Footy Channel.

The Best and Fairest medal was awarded to New Zealand's James Bowden.

Grand Final was played as a curtain raiser to the round 20 AFL match between Collingwood vs Carlton, so this figure is the total crowd for the match, although not all spectators were inside the stadium at the start or conclusion of the curtain raiser event.

Final standings 
  New Zealand
  Papua New Guinea
  USA
  Ireland
  Samoa
  Great Britain
  Canada
  South Africa
  Japan
  Spain

2005 Australian Football International Cup All Stars Team 
Like the All-Australian Team in the Australian Football League, a team selected from the best players in the International Cup was selected. Team members were unplaced and not allocated to any specific field position.

Tournament Best & Fairest winners

References

External links 
 http://www.aussierulesinternational.com
 Australian Football International Cup, 2005 - World Footy News review of all matches
 Match results from the Footy Record

Australian Football International Cup
Australian Football International Cup, 2005